First Baptist Christian School is a private Christian school serving children from preschool through 12th grade in Elyria, Ohio.  The school was founded in 1976. It has been serving Christian families through education for many years. Through advancements in technology, they have pioneered through the use of a blended learning method, using Chromebooks as textbooks in classes.

Notes and references

External links
 School Website

1976 establishments in Ohio
Baptist schools in the United States
Christian schools in Ohio
High schools in Lorain County, Ohio
Educational institutions established in 1976
Private high schools in Ohio
Private middle schools in Ohio
Private elementary schools in Ohio